Iroquois Ironmen were a Canadian professional indoor lacrosse team that played in the Canadian Lacrosse League. The Ironmen, along with the Ohsweken Demons, played out of the Iroquois Lacrosse Arena in Ohsweken, Ontario.  On November 8, 2013, team owner Rodney Hill announced that the team would be folding prior to the 2014 season.

History
The Ironmen played their first game ever on January 7, 2012, at home, in Hagersville, Ontario.  The Ironmen lost the game to the Brampton Inferno 18-11 in what was CLax's inaugural game.

Season-by-season record
''Note: GP = Games played, W = Wins, L = Losses, T = Ties, OTL = Overtime losses, Pts = Points, GF = Goals for, GA = Goals against

References

External links
Official CLax website

Canadian Lacrosse League
Lacrosse teams in Ontario
Lacrosse of the Iroquois Confederacy
Lacrosse clubs established in 2011
2011 establishments in Ontario
Sports clubs disestablished in 2013
2013 disestablishments in Ontario